Gargnano is a town and comune in the province of Brescia, in Lombardy. It is situated on the western shore of Lake Garda. The municipal territory includes the artificial Valvestino Lake, created in 1962.

History
The name of the village appears for the first time in a document of 937 as Garniano, perhaps derived from the Latin stem Garenius. Passages of the Roman historian Titus Livius and inscriptions on headstones testify to the presence of Etruscans, Celts, Cenomani and Romans.

From 1350 to 1426 the territory of Gargnano was a dominion of the Visconti of Milan, later a dominion of the Republic of Venice.

In 1866 Gargnano was bombarded by the Austrian navy during the fighting on Lake Garda which formed part of the Third Italian War of Independence.

Notable residents
 Giovanni Beatrice, called Zanzanù, and Eliseo Baruffaldo, brigands of the 17th century
 Pietro Bellotto, Baroque painter
 Lorenzo Fiorini, Domenico Pattuccelli and Tommaso Chiaromonte, volunteers in the southern army of Giuseppe Garibaldi during the military campaign of 1860
 Alexander Bettoni Cazzago, soldier, partisan and horseman. Won the Siena Square dressage competition in 1942. As colonel of the Third Regiment of the Savoy Cavalry in 1942 he led charges in the Russian campaign that are among the last uses of cavalry in modern warfare. 
 Erika Blanc, actress
 Cesare Lievi, theatre director, poet and dramatist
 Benito Mussolini, during the Italian Social Republic (the Republic of Saló) lived in the Villa delle Orsoline (Villa Feltrinelli)
 D. H. Lawrence, novelist lived in Gargnano from 18 September 1912 to 30 March 1913 with Frieda Weekley von Richthofen
 Uto Ughi, violinist
 Oscar Ghiglia, guitarist
 Giuseppe Maria Bernini, Capuchin friar and missionary

Sources

Cities and towns in Lombardy
Populated places on Lake Garda